"Brian Wilson is a genius" is a line that became part of a media campaign spearheaded in 1966 by the Beatles' former press officer Derek Taylor, who was then employed as the Beach Boys' publicist. Although there are earlier documented expressions of the statement, Taylor frequently called Brian Wilson a "genius" as part of an effort to rebrand the Beach Boys and legitimize Wilson as a serious artist on par with the Beatles and Bob Dylan.

With the aid of numerous associates in the music industry, Taylor's promotional efforts were integral to the success of the band's 1966 album Pet Sounds in England. By the end of the year, an NME reader's poll placed Wilson as the fourth-ranked "World Music Personality"—about 1,000 votes ahead of Bob Dylan and 500 behind John Lennon. However, the hype generated for the group's next album, Smile, bore a number of unintended consequences for the band's reputation and internal dynamic. Wilson ultimately scrapped Smile and reduced his involvement with the group.

Wilson later said that the "genius" branding intensified the pressures of his career and led him to become "a victim of the recording industry". As he shied away from the industry in the years afterward, his ensuing legend originated the trope of the "reclusive genius" among studio-oriented musical artists and later inspired comparisons between other musicians such as Pink Floyd's Syd Barrett and My Bloody Valentine's Kevin Shields.

Background and origins

Brian Wilson wrote the majority of the Beach Boys' hits and was one of the first recording artists allowed to act as an entrepreneurial producer, a position he attained thanks to his immediate success with the band after signing to Capitol Records in 1962. His talents inspired a number of Los Angeles music industry figures to refer to him as a genius. By early 1966, he wanted to move the group beyond their surf and hot rod aesthetic, an image that he believed was outdated and distracting the public from his talents as a producer and songwriter. In Mike Love's description, Wilson sought recognition from the countercultural tastemakers, or the "hip intelligentsia". Wilson later reflected that "legends grew about ... our music ... and I was getting fascinated with the fact that I was becoming famous and there was an interest in my style of life."

In the meantime, the Beatles' former press agent Derek Taylor had left the UK and moved to California, where he started his own public relations company. By 1966, he had quickly assimilated into what was then an expanding coterie of Wilson's worldly-minded friends, musicians, mystics, and business advisers. In the description of music journalist Nick Kent, "Derek Taylor was at that time the single most prestigious figure with whom to have one's name linked in matters of promotion. ... he knew the Beatles and had actually worked with them and Brian Epstein. There could be no more spectacular recommendation."

Van Dyke Parks, Wilson's lyricist at the time, claimed to have introduced Taylor to Wilson, while biographer David Leaf wrote that it was Bruce Johnston who "set up a meeting for Derek with Brian." The Beach Boys began employing Taylor as their publicist in March 1966, two months before the release of their album Pet Sounds, with the group paying him a salary of $750 a month (equivalent to $ in ). According to Carl Wilson, although the band were aware that trends and the music industry were shifting, "Capitol had a very set picture of us", and the band were unhappy with the way the label promoted them circa Pet Sounds.

According to Taylor, the "genius" promotion came from Brian discussing how "he thought he was better than most other people believed him to be". Taylor recalled one conversation with Brian and Dennis Wilson in which the brothers denied ever writing "surf music or songs about cars or that the Beach Boys had been involved in any way with the surf and drag fads ... they would not concede." In Taylor's view, the Beach Boys' clean-cut "all-American" image, instigated by former manager and the Wilsons' father Murry, had "done them a hell of a lot of damage. Brian, in particular, suffered." He said that the prevailing attitude was that "Brian Wilson was not supposed to be strange", even though that quality was seen as normal for Hollywood people.

After becoming aware of how highly regarded Wilson was to musician friends such as Parks and singer Danny Hutton, Taylor wondered why it was not the mainstream consensus, and began "putting it around, making almost a campaign out of it". To update the band's image with firsthand accounts of Wilson's latest activities, Taylor's prestige was crucial in offering a credible perspective to those outside Wilson's inner circle. He became intent on promoting Wilson as an exceptional "genius" among pop artists, a belief that he genuinely held.

Contemporary press

March–June 1966

One of the earliest instances of Taylor announcing that Wilson was a genius was in his 1966 article titled "Brian Wilson: Whizzkid Behind the Beach Boys". More references to the "genius" rhetoric appeared in Melody Maker and New Musical Express, specifically the articles "Brian, Pop Genius!" by Don Traynor (May 21, 1966), "Brian Wilson's Puppets?" by Alan Walsh (November 12, 1966), and "Brian: Loved or Loathed Genius" by Tracy Thomas (January 28, 1967). In Taylor's writings, Wilson was presented as a pop luminary on the level of esteemed contemporaries such as John Lennon, Paul McCartney, and Bob Dylan, as well as classical figures such as Bach, Beethoven, and Mozart. What follows is a typical excerpt by Taylor, identified as "'60s Hollywood reporter Jerry Fineman", and contains some exaggerated claims:

Pet Sounds was widely influential and raised the band's prestige as an innovative rock group. Taylor is widely recognized as instrumental in the album's success in the UK due to his longstanding connections with the Beatles and other industry figures. This was at a contrast to its underwhelming sales in the US, where its promotion was no different from earlier Beach Boys offerings and relied on the group's familiar public image instead of rebranding. Although most of the influential writers who had acknowledged the cultural value of Bob Dylan's work were not prepared to devote similar attention the Beach Boys, as biographer Peter Ames Carlin writes, "many musicians [in America] understood the significance of Brian's achievement on the album, as did a few members of the small but increasingly influential band of journalists and intellectuals who had begun to apply serious analytical thought to rock music."

In May, Taylor and Bruce Johnston traveled to London and arranged listening parties for the album, inviting prestigious musicians (including Lennon and McCartney) and rock journalists. These journalists subsequently helped promulgate the idea of Wilson as a "pop genius" and of the album's forward-thinking aesthetic. Much of the British and American press also focused on the disparity between Wilson as a "studio mastermind" and the Beach Boys' stage performances. Rolling Stone founding editor Jann Wenner later reported that British fans identified the Beach Boys as "years ahead" of the Beatles and declared Wilson a "genius". Musicians who praised Wilson on record included Lennon, Eric Clapton of Cream, Rolling Stones producer Andrew Loog Oldham, Spencer Davis of the Spencer Davis Group, and Mick Jagger of the Rolling Stones. Clapton told Melody Maker that "Brian Wilson is without doubt a pop genius."

June–December 1966 
Throughout the summer of 1966, Wilson concentrated on finishing the group's next single, "Good Vibrations". Additional writers were brought in as witnesses to his Columbia, Gold Star, and Western recording sessions, who also accompanied him outside the studio. Among the crowd: Richard Goldstein from the Village Voice, Jules Siegel from The Saturday Evening Post, and Paul Williams, the 18-year-old founder and editor of Crawdaddy! Released on October 10, 1966, "Good Vibrations" was the Beach Boys' third US number-one hit, reaching the top of the Billboard Hot 100 in December, and became their first number one in Britain. One headline proclaimed that the Beach Boys' British distributor EMI Records were giving the band the "biggest campaign since the Beatles".

As quoted in interviews, Wilson declared that the group's next album Smile (originally called Dumb Angel) would "be as much an improvement over [Pet] Sounds as that was over Summer Days". A Los Angeles Times West Magazine piece by Tom Nolan focused on the contradictions between Wilson's unassuming "suburban" demeanor and the reputation that preceded him (noting "he doesn't look at all like the seeming leader of a potentially-revolutionary movement in pop music"). When asked where he believed music would go, Wilson responded: "White spirituals, I think that's what we're going to hear. Songs of faith."

At the end of 1966, NME conducted a reader's poll that placed Wilson as the fourth-ranked "World Music Personality"—about 1,000 votes ahead of Bob Dylan and 500 behind John Lennon. Taylor also arranged for Wilson to appear in the CBS television documentary Inside Pop: The Rock Revolution hosted by Leonard Bernstein (aired April 1967). The segment simply featured Wilson at a piano in his home, singing and playing the as-yet-unreleased "Surf's Up", without any interview footage or subtext concerning the impending Smile.

"Goodbye Surfing, Hello God!" 
In May 1967, Taylor announced that Smile had been "scrapped" and the music press subsequently amplified their romantic depictions of Wilson. In October, Cheetah magazine published "Goodbye Surfing, Hello God!", a memoir written by Jules Siegel. It included a tongue-in-cheek reference to the widespread "genius" rhetoric, with Siegel pondering the question of whether Wilson was "a genius, Genius, or GENIUS". Siegel covered Wilson's struggle to overcome the band's surfing image in the US and credited the collapse of Smile to "an obsessive cycle of creation and destruction that threatened not only his career and his fortune but also his marriage, his friendships, his relationships with the Beach Boys and, some of his closest friends worried, his mind".

According to academic Kirk Curnett, Siegel's article was "the most instrumental in establishing Brian as mercurial in the broader senses of that term: as an eccentric and erratic artist perilously pursuing the muse instead of blithely serving the masses". Also discussing the article, professor Andrew Flory wrote:

Aftermath and Wilson's withdrawal

Wilson later said that he had run out of ideas by 1967 "in a conventional sense" and was "about ready to die". He also expressed a  dissatisfaction with being branded a genius: "Once you've been labeled as a genius, you have to continue it or your name becomes mud. I am a victim of the recording industry." Parks echoed that Taylor's line "forced Brian Wilson to have to continuously prove that he's a genius". Mike Love said that Wilson turned to drugs as a way to expand his creative conceptions and deliver on the comparisons he had received with the Beatles and Mozart.

On December 14, 1967, Jann Wenner printed an influential article in Rolling Stone that denounced the "genius" label, which he called a "promotional shuck" and a "pointless" attempt to compare Wilson with the Beatles. He wrote: "Wilson believed [that he was a genius] and felt obligated to make good of it. It left Wilson in a bind ... which meant that a year elapsed between Pet Sounds and their latest release, Smiley Smile." As a result of the article, many rock fans excluded the group from "serious consideration". In a September 1968 piece for Jazz & Pop, Gene Sculatti wrote that a rock controversy involving Wilson was brewing among "the academic 'rock as art' critic-intellectuals, the AM-tuned teenies, and all the rest of us in between. ... the California sextet is simultaneously hailed as genius incarnate and derided as the archetypical pop music copouts".

Wilson's bandmates resented that he was singled out as a "genius". Love reflected that while Brian deserved the recognition, the press was a frustration to everyone in the group. He said that Carl was especially bothered by the misconception that the members were "nameless music components in Brian's music machine". Brian's then-wife Marilyn intimated that Brian "felt guilty that he got all the attention and ... was called a genius" and decided to reduce his involvement with the band "because he thought that they all hated him".  From 1968 onward, his songwriting output declined substantially, but the public narrative of "Brian-as-leader" continued.  He became increasingly known for his reclusiveness and would not attract the level of press attention he achieved in the 1960s until a new marketing campaign, "Brian's Back!", was devised in 1976.

By the 1970s, both fans and detractors began to view Wilson as a burned-out acid casualty. Some of the characterizations advanced by industry insiders included "genius musician but an amateur human being", "washed-up", "bloated", "another sad fucking case", and "a loser". In 1971, Carl commented that the Jules Siegel writings "and a lot of that stuff that went around before really turned [Brian] off." He explained that most of it was "grossly inaccurate" and characterized Brian as "a very highly evolved person" who is "very sensitive at the same time, which can be confusing," adding that Brian does not cooperate with the press "at all".

In 1975, NME published an extended three-part piece by journalist Nick Kent, "The Last Beach Movie", which depicted Wilson as an overeating, fey eccentric. According to music historian Luis Sanchez: "The article followed the bombast of Siegel's 'Genius with a capital G' line to some bizarre ends. ... the reader is left with the image of an insufferable man out of touch with reality: the leader of The Beach Boys reduced to a caricature, tormented by his own genius." Carlin wrote that Wilson's "public suffering" effectively "transformed him from a musical figure into a cultural one", while journalist Paul Lester said that Wilson, by the mid-1970s, had tied with ex-Pink Floyd member Syd Barrett as "rock's numero uno mythical casualty."

In 1978, David Leaf's biography The Beach Boys and the California Myth was published. While the "Goodbye Surfing, Hello God" article originated all the main reference points of the Wilson/Smile mythology, Sanchez references Leaf's book as the first work that "put the 'Brian Wilson is a genius' trope into perspective", especially by emphasizing a "dynamic of good guys and bad guys." Quoted in the book, music journalist Ben Edmonds cited Taylor's "'Brian Wilson Is a Genius' hype" as "one of those things that has come back to haunt Brian like a curse. ... the whole playing on the Brian Wilson mythology, whether it be for that point in time or 1976, has always been crucial to manipulating the Beach Boys."

Retrospective criticism

A major tenet of Wilson's "genius" rests on a narrative familiar to the arc of a tragic artist.  At the center of his legend, according to music critic Carl Wilson (no relation to the Beach Boys' Carl Wilson), is this "tragic genius". Carl wrote in 2015:

He concluded that the interest in Brian's life comes primarily from a "human-interest angle" concerned with "the popular tendency to fetishise any overlap between genius and madness" rather than a purely musical one, ultimately distorting "both Wilson's story and his significance." Music critic Barney Hoskyns described Taylor's campaign as "the birth of a pop cult" and added that the term genius "is actually a rare commodity in pop music" more likely to be reserved for artists who espouse "tragedy", "failed promise", "torment", "or the very least by major eccentricity." He located the "particular appeal" of Wilson's genius to "the fact that the Beach Boys were the very obverse of hip – the unlikeliness of these songs growing out of disposable surf pop – and in the singular naivety and ingenuousness of his personality."

Writing in The Rolling Stone Record Guide (1983), Dave Marsh bemoaned that Wilson became a "Major Artist" through the hype that continued to surround Wilson and the Smile project throughout the 1970s, calling it "an exercise in myth-mongering almost unparalleled in show business". Van Dyke Parks believed that Wilson was a highly innovative songwriter, but that it was a "mistake" to call him a genius, instead preferring the description of "a lucky guy with a tremendous amount of talent and a lot of people collaborating beautifully around him."

As a result of the mythology surrounding Wilson, Mike Love is often regarded as Wilson's lifelong antagonist. After a jury ruled that Love was owed credit to 39 songs previously credited solely to Wilson and that Wilson or his agents had engaged in promissory fraud, the potential damages were estimated to range between $58 million and $342 million. According to Love, fans of Wilson thought "he was beyond accountability. ... By now, the myth was too strong, the legend too great. Brian was the tormented genius who suffered to deliver us his music—the forever victim, as his lawyer said."

Record producer Don Was created a documentary about Wilson, I Just Wasn't Made for These Times (1995), reportedly to address why the phrase "Brian Wilson is a genius" had become "holy gospel" among musicians. C.W. Mahoney of The Washington Free Beacon characterized Wilson's appeal to Millennials as "a Daniel Johnston who made listenable music".  He opined that Wilson's reputed genius "is evidence of our obsession with childlike innocence and the victory of boring poptimism", adding that Pet Sounds may be "great" but not as sophisticated as other 1966 works by Frank Zappa or Miles Davis.

Wilson's response

Wilson said: "I didn't think I was a genius. I thought I had talent. But I didn't think I was a genius." In the early 1990s, he referred to the branding as a burden and as the worst thing that had happened to him: "The idea being that you're automatically categorized, and the idea is to break free ... and do a few things not based on what you think others would want to hear." Asked if he disliked being known as a "crazy guy" who writes "crazy songs", he replied: "Yeah, I do. ...  I think it's exaggerated. It's going an extra 20 yards."

In a eulogy given at Taylor's funeral in 1997, Wilson praised Taylor's efforts and credited him with the success of Pet Sounds and "Good Vibrations" in Britain. He stated: "Despite what he wrote about me, it was Derek Taylor who was the genius. He was a genius writer."

See also
 The Beach Boys Love You – album received with a sharp divide between fans and critics, some of whom saw the album as a work of "eccentric genius" whereas others "dismissed it as childish and trivial".
 Creativity and mental illness
 Honorific nicknames in popular music
 "Clapton is God"
 Astroturfing

Notes

References

Bibliography

Further reading
Book
  – analysis of the "genius" rhetoric surrounding Wilson
Web articles
 
 
 
 
 

Contemporary articles
 
 
 
 
 

1960s in American music
1966 in American music
1967 in American music
Advertising campaigns
American advertising slogans
Brian Wilson
Creativity and mental illness
Music journalism
The Beach Boys
1966 neologisms
Quotations from music
1960s in mass media
Music fandom
Cultural depictions of rock musicians
Cultural depictions of American men